Tabernaemontana elegans, the toad tree, is a shrub or small tree in the family Apocynaceae. It is native to eastern Africa.

Description
Its fragrant flowers feature white, creamy or pale yellow corolla lobes. Fruit consists of 2 separate ovoid or ellipsoid pods, up to  each.

Distribution and habitat
Tabernaemontana elegans grows in forests or bushland from sea level to  altitude. The species is native to Somalia, Kenya, Tanzania, Mozambique, Zimbabwe, Eswatini and South Africa.

Uses
Tabernaemontana elegans has some local medicinal uses including the treatment of heart disease, cancer, tuberculosis and venereal diseases. The species is also used as an aphrodisiac. The Zulu name for this genus, iNomfi, refers to the use of their sticky, milky latex as bird-lime.

Chemistry
Fourteen indole alkaloids have been isolated in the callus culture of Tabernaemontana elegans (isovoacangine, 3-R/S-hydroxy-isovoacangine, 3-R/S-hydroxy-coronaridine, isositsirikine, geissoschizol, tabernaemontanine, vobasine, vobasinol, apparicine, 16-hydroxy-16,22-dihydro-apparicine, tubotaiwine, 3-R/S-hydroxy-conodurine and monogagaine) of which apparicine is the principal.

References

elegans
Plants described in 1894
Plants used in traditional African medicine
Flora of Africa